Nizhnecherekulevo (Tübänge Serekkül) is a rural locality (a selo) and the administrative centre of Cherekulevsky Selsoviet, Ilishevsky District, Bashkortostan, Russia. The population was 573 as of 2010. There are 8 streets.

Geography 
Nizhnecherekulevo is located 9 km northeast of Verkhneyarkeyevo (the district's administrative centre) by road. Verkhnecherekulevo is the nearest rural locality.

References 

Rural localities in Ilishevsky District